Pachypodium succulentum is a member of the family Apocynaceae native to the Cape Provinces and the Free State province of South Africa.

Description
True to its name, P. succulentum is characterised by its sturdy water-holding swallowed-stem base. Thin, near-straight shoots grow from this base to a height of around 1.6 feet and are covered in 0.8 inch thorns that come in pairs. Leaves are found on the upper parts of the shoots and are narrow, dark green, lanceolate and feature venation. Flowers are pink or white.

References

The Complete Encyclopedia of Succulents by Zdenek Jezek and Libor Kunte

succulentum
Flora of the Cape Provinces
Flora of the Free State